René Lodewijk Maurits Derolez (7 September 1921 – 24 March 2005) was a Belgian philologist who was Professor of English and Germanic Philology at Ghent University. He specialized in runology and the study of Old English literature and Germanic religion.

Biography
René Lodewijk Maurits Derolez was born in Aalst, Belgium on 7 September 1921. During the German occupation of Belgium during World War II, Derolez studies Germanic philology at the Ghent University. He served in the Allied forces during the liberation of Belgium. Derolez subsequently received a scholarship from the Belgian American Educational Foundation, and studied at Harvard University from 1946 to 1948. He received an MA at Harvard and his PhD summa cum laude at Ghent in 1947. He gained his habilitation at Ghent in 1954 with the thesis Runica Manuscripta. Runica Manuscripta has remained a standard work on runology up to the present day.

After gaining his habilitation, Derolez became a lecturer at Ghent, and was in 1959 appointed Professor of English and Germanic Philology at the Ghent University. From 1962 to 1964, Delorez was also Dean of the Faculty of Philosophy at Ghent University. He retired from the Ghent University in 1984.

Delorez was elected a Member of the Royal Flemish Academy of Belgium for Science and the Arts in 1970. He was elected a Corresponding Member of the British Academy in 1971. Delorez was Co-Editor of Anglo Saxon England in 1972 and Co-Editor of English Studies from 1964 to 1979, serving as its Editor in 1970. In 1983 he was elected the founding President of the International Society of Anglo-Saxonists.

Delorez specialized in the study of early Germanic culture, particularly runes, Old English literature (particularly Beowulf) and Germanic religion and Germanic mythology. His books on Germanic religion won him wide acclaim, and were translated into several languages.

During his studies at Harvard, Delorez met Gabrielle von Steiger, daughter of Swiss politician Eduard von Steiger, and the two subsequently married. His brother Albert Derolez is a medievalist and professor at the Free University of Brussels.

Delorez died in Aalst on 24 March 2005.

See also
 Jan de Vries
 Otto Höfler
 Edgar C. Polomé
 Rudolf Much
 Wolfgang Krause
 Georges Dumézil
 Franz Rolf Schröder
 Gabriel Turville-Petre

Selected works
 Runica Manuscripta, 1953
 Götter und Mythen der Germanen , 1959
 Les Celtes et les Germains, 1965
 The Origin of the Runes, 1998

Sources
 Albert Derolez: René Derolez (1921 – 2005). In: Alfred Bammesberger, Gabriele Waxenberger (eds.): Das fuþark und seine einzelsprachlichen Weiterentwicklungen, Ergänzungsbände zum Reallexikon der Germanischen Altertumskunde Vol. 51. De Gruyter, Berlin – New York 2006. 
 

1921 births
2005 deaths
Anglo-Saxon studies scholars
Belgian editors
Belgian magazine editors
Belgian non-fiction writers
Belgian philologists
Belgian resistance members
Corresponding Fellows of the British Academy
Germanic studies scholars
People from Aalst, Belgium
Ghent University alumni
Academic staff of Ghent University
Harvard University alumni
Runologists
Writers on Germanic paganism
20th-century non-fiction writers
20th-century philologists